Lesuuda is a surname of Kenyan origin. Notable people with the surname include:

Andrew Lesuuda (born 1991), Kenyan long-distance runner
Jacob Lesuuda, Kenyan Anglican bishop
Naisula Lesuuda (born 1984), Kenyan politician and women's rights activist

Kenyan names